Ann-Sofie Kylin (born 14 November 1955) is a Swedish actress. She starred in the 1970 film A Swedish Love Story.

Selected filmography
 A Swedish Love Story (1970)
  (as Fia, 6 episodes)
  (as Anki, uncredited)

References

External links

1955 births
Living people
20th-century Swedish actresses
21st-century Swedish actresses
Swedish film actresses
Swedish television actresses
Actresses from Stockholm